A Warning to the Hindus is a 1939 booklet by Savitri Devi. It was written to further Indian nationalism by way of Nazi ethics and spirituality. Savitri believed the Indian people to be of Aryan descent, and thus sought to promote explicitly Nazi ideals, such as ethnic purity and xenophobia, within India. Within the text, emphasis is focused on many supposed horrors the future could hold should India choose to accept diversity and reject Nazi Aryanism. The author projected Hindu India as the last surviving remnant of ancient Aryan spirituality, and issued this work as a warning to what she perceived as the threat of submergence through ‘alien,’ meaning non-Aryan, influences, such as Islam.

Background and summary 

After working at the Hindu Mission in Calcutta for eighteen months, and having been influenced by V.D. Savarkar's concept of Hindutva, Devi concluded that “. . . nothing is more necessary, to-day, than to revive, to exalt, to cultivate intelligent Hinduism through the length and breadth of India.” A Warning to the Hindus is Devi’s attempt to alert Hindus to the threat of submergence and cultural alienation, which she saw as resulting from the disproportional growth of the Muslim population in India. She thought the hitherto complacent response of upper-caste Hindus would result in Hinduism suffering the same fate as pagan classical Greece.

The book expresses admiration of Hinduism for its view of visible beauty, its broad artistic outlook on life and the universe, and its conception of God as both creative and destructive: living expressions of Aryan Paganism, which Devi saw as being lost in the West. As an outspoken Nazi, she criticizes Judaism, Christianity, and Islam as creedal religions, and for being narrowly anthropocentric, in contrast with Hinduism, which is presented as biocentric.

Devi proposes that the numerical decline of Hinduism could be successfully remedied by a relaxation of the strict rules implicit in the caste system, which would have the additional benefits of developing Hindu solidarity and nationalist sentiment. Additionally, she argues that women should play a more active role in fostering devotional nationalism in the home with shrines to Shivaji and other national heroes.

Publication 
A Warning to the Hindus was first published by Brahmachari Bijoy Krishna of the Hindu Mission in Calcutta in 1939, with a foreword by G.D. Savarkar (brother of V.D. Savarkar). It was translated into six Indian languages, including Bengali, Hindi, and Marathi. It was re-published in 1993 by Promilla Paperbacks (New Delhi).

Notes

References 
 Hitler's Priestess: Savitri Devi, the Hindu-Aryan Myth, and National-Socialism by Nicholas Goodrick-Clarke, pp. 52–58 (New York University Press, 1998, hardcover: ,).
 The Saffron Swastika: The Notion of "Hindu Fascism" by Koenraad Elst, chapter V. "Savitri Devi and the "Hindu-Aryan Myth"", section vii. "A Warning to the Hindus". (New Delhi: Voice of India, 2001, 2 Vols.).

External links 
 A Warning to the Hindus (PDF)

1939 non-fiction books
Books by Savitri Devi
Hindu nationalism
Far-right politics in India